The Great King, Sejong is a 2008 South Korean historical television series depicting the life of the fourth monarch of Joseon, Sejong the Great (played by Kim Sang-kyung). Considered one of the greatest kings in Korean history, Sejong created Hangul, the Korean alphabet. The series aired on KBS from January 5 to December 7, 2008 on Saturdays and Sundays at 21:30 for 86 episodes. Episodes 1 to 26 aired on KBS1, and episodes 27 to 86 aired on KBS2.

Plot
Born as the third son, Chungnyeong was far from ascending the throne. His early years were turbulent as Joseon faced political tensions from both within and abroad. Eventually, the young prince finds himself living in a private residence outside of the palace and experiences the everyday life of commoners until he is a young man. After his ascension to the throne, Chungyeong (now called King Sejong) stabilizes the newly born country and gives rise to a blooming culture. In the process he invents Hangul, the Korean writing system.

Cast

Main
Kim Sang-kyung as Grand Prince Chungnyeong / King Sejong the Great
Kim Do-hyun as child Grand Prince Chungnyeong
Lee Hyun-woo as young Grand Prince Chungnyeong
Kim Young-chul as King Taejong; Sejong's father
Choi Myung-gil as Queen Wongyeong of the Yeoheung Min clan; Sejong's mother
Park Sang-min as Grand Prince Yangnyeong; Sejong's first brother
Jung Chan-woo as child Grand Prince Yangnyeong
Lee In as teenage Grand Prince Yangnyeong
Lee Jung-hyun as Royal Noble Consort Shin of the Cheongju Kim clan; Sejong's concubine
Lee Yoon-ji as Queen Soheon of the Cheongsong Shim clan; Sejong's wife
Nam Ji-hyun as young Lady Shim

Supporting

People in Joseon

Royal household
Lee Sang-yeob as Crown Prince Yi Hyang; Sejong's first son
Oh Eun-chan as child Crown Prince Yi Hyang
Kang Bit as young Crown Prince Yi Hyang
Seo Joon-young as Grand Prince Suyang; Sejong's second son
Choi Min-ho as young Grand Prince Suyang
Yoo Seo-jin as Lady Kim, Grand Princess Consort Suseong of the Gwangsan Kim clan; Yangnyeong's wife
Yeo Yoon-jung as young Lady Kim
Ahn Shin-woo as Grand Prince Hyoryeong; Sejong's second brother
Seo Hyun-bin as child Grand Prince Hyoryeong
Yoo Tae-woong as young Grand Prince Hyoryeong
Kwon Sung-hyun as Lady Jeong, Grand Princess Consort Yeseong of the Haeju Jeong clan; Hyoryeong's wife
Yoon Young-joon as Prince Gyeongnyeong; Sejong's fourth brother
Noh Young-hak as young Prince Gyeongnyeong
Baek Seung-do as Grand Prince Seongnyeong; Sejong's sixth brother
Joo Young-min as child Grand Prince Seongnyeong
Joo Da-young as Princess Jeongso; Sejong's first daughter
Kim Ji-won as child Princess Jeongso
Lee Joo-hyun as Princess Jeongui; Sejong's second daughter
Yeo Min-joo as Crown Princess Sun of the Haeum Bong clan; Yi Hyang's second wife
Han Shi-hoon as Grand Prince Anpyeong; Sejong's third son
Kang Han-byul as child Grand Prince Anpyeong
Yoon Se-ah as Royal Noble Consort Hyo of the Cheongpung Kim clan; Taejong's concubine
Kang Kyung-heon as Cho Gung-jang; Jeongjong's concubine
Jo Sun-ok as Royal Noble Consort Ui of the Andong Kwon clan; Taejong's concubine
Noh Young-guk as King Jeongjong; Sejong's second uncle
Jung Doo-hong as King Taejo; Sejong's grandfather

New supporters
Kim Kap-soo as Chief State Councillor Hwang Hui
Ahn Dae-yong as Maeng Sa-sung
Lee Won-jong as Yun Hoe
Jo Sung-ha as Yi Su
Sun Dong-hyuk as Choe Yun-deok
Lee Jin-woo as Jeong In-ji
Lee Sung-min as Choe Man-ri
Kim Young-ki as Byeon Gye-ryang
Lee Byung-wook as Kim Jong-seo
Lee Dal-hyung as Shin Jang
Kwon Yul as Shin Suk-ju
Oh Yong as Jung Chang-son
Yoon Ki-won as Uhm Ja-chi

Old supporters
Kim Ki-hyun as Yu Jung-hyun
Jung Dong-hwan as Jo Mal-saeng
Kim Ha-kyun as Heo Jo
Kim Jung-hak as Kim Mun

Others
Lee Chun-hee as Jang Yeong-sil
Jun Hyun as Yi Cheon
Lee Dae-yeon as Choe Hae-san
Choi Jong-won as Ha Ryun
Park Young-ji as Park Eun
Choi Sang-hoon as Shim On; Sejong's father-in-law
Jung Heung-chae as Kang Sang-in
Choi Joo-bong as Kim Han-ro
Kim Eung-soo as Min Mu-gu, Sejong's first maternal uncle
Lee Kyung-young as Min Mu-jil, Sejong's second maternal uncle
Kim Hyung-il as Min Mu-hyul, Sejong's third maternal uncle
Lee Woo-suk as Min Mu-hoe, Sejong's fourth maternal uncle
Kim Joo-young as Yi Suk-beon
Park Sang-jo as Yi Jong-mu
Jang Ki-yong as Yi Soon-mong
Lee Won-bal as Park Sil
Hwang Bum-shik as Noh Hee-bong

People in Ming
Oh Seung-yoon as the Emperor Jeongtong
Kim Jin-sung as child Jeongtong
Go In-bum as Eunuch Hwang Eom
Lee Dae-ro as Eunuch Wang Jin
Kim Hak-chul as Huang Chan
Jeong Yu-mi as Da-yeon
Ha Yong-jin as Hae Su, Huang Chen's commander
Shim Woo-chang as Yeo-jin

People in Goryeo
Kim Yong-soo as Wang Ahn
Kim Myung-kon as Ok Hwan
Kim Seung-wook as Jeon Haeng-su
Jung Ui-gap as Mu-bi
Moon Chun-shik as Jeon Il-ji
Choi Sang-kil as Jang Chil-sang
Park Yong-soo as Han Young-ro

People in Japan
Bae Sung-woo as Pyung Do-jun
Jang Se-jin as Jong Jung-sung
Seo Jin-won as Jong Jun
Park Jung-woo as Jung Wu
Lee Jong-goo as General Gu Ju

People in Jurchen
Shin Dong-hoon as Yi Man-ju
Bang Hyung-joo as Dong Maeng-ga
Ham Suk-hoon as Ah-woo, Dong Maeng-ga's older brother

More
Lee Il-jae as Kim Do-ryun
Lee Jung-hyun as Yi Seon
Cha Min-ji as Dam-yi
Kim Bo-mi as Court Lady Han
Jo Byung-ki as Sa-ddo
Jo Min-joon as Park Kyum
Kang Ji-hu as Pung-gae
Won Jong-rye as Kisaeng Nyu; Jang Young-shil's mother
Ahn Hae-sook as Lady Ahn of the Sunheung Ahn clan; Sejong's mother-in-law
Kwon Sung-hyun as Yi Kyung-sook
Sun-Hak as Oh Mak-ji
Jung Jong-hyun as the head of Ikisima
Kim Sun-eun as Tong-sa
Kim Seung-hoon as Yamata
Jo Jae-wan as Jang Won
Oh Yeon-seo as Eori
Kim Hong-pyo as Yi Soon-ji
Seol Ji-yoon as Toegi-chunwol
Lee Han-gal as Kang-hwi
Kim Ji-young as the old woman

Awards and nominations

References

External links
  
 
 

Korean Broadcasting System television dramas
2008 South Korean television series debuts
2008 South Korean television series endings
Sejong the Great
Korean-language television shows
Television series set in the Joseon dynasty
South Korean historical television series